Cinema City may refer to:

 Cinema City, a Canadian cinema chain operated by Cineplex Entertainment
 Cinema City & Films Co., a defunct Hong Kong company that created films during 1980 to 1991
 Cinema City (film festival), a film festival in Novi Sad, Serbia, aka Film Festival of Serbia
 Cinema City International, a chain of cinemas in Central Europe operated by Cineworld
 Cinema City Czech Republic
 Cinema City Hungary
 Cinema City Poland
 Norwich Cinema City